Merry is a surname. Notable persons with that surname include:

 Abdelkrim Merry (born 1955), Moroccan footballer
 Ann Brunton Merry (1769–1808), English actress
 Anthony Merry (1756–1835), British diplomat
 Arlette Merry (1918–2015), French actress and singer
 Cyril Merry (1911–1964), West Indies cricketer
 David Merry (cricketer) (1923–1944), Tobagonian cricketer and Royal Air Force officer
 David Merry (born 1945), British ambassador
 Diana Merry (1970s–80s), American computer programmer
 Eleanor Merry (1873–1956), English poet, artist, musician and anthroposophist
 Emma Merry (born 1974), English discus thrower
 Frederick Carles Merry (1837–1900), American architect
 George Merry (born 1929), Canadian skier
 Gus Merry (1888–1942), Welsh dual-code international rugby player
 Isabelle Merry (1908–2002), Australian Congregational minister and chaplain
 James Merry (Scottish politician) (1805–1877), MP for Falkirk Burghs 1859–74
 James R. Merry (1927–2001), Republican member of the Pennsylvania House of Representatives
 Katharine Merry (born 1974), English sprinter
 Mustafa Merry (born 1958), Moroccan footballer
 Nick Merry (born 1961/2), British businessman ad football club chairman
 Olivia Merry (born 1992), New Zealand field hockey player
 Peter Merry (born 1969), American author and public speaker
 Robert Merry (1755–1798), English poet and dilettante
 Robert W. Merry (born 1946), American journalist and author
 Sally Engle Merry (1944–2020), American anthropologist
 Thomas Merry (1605–1682), English landowner, mathematician and politician
 William Merry (disambiguation), several people

See also
Merry (disambiguation)
Mery (disambiguation)